William John McConnell (6 September 1927 – 11 December 1985) was a Canadian rower. He competed in the men's eight event at the 1948 Summer Olympics.

References

1927 births
1985 deaths
Canadian male rowers
Olympic rowers of Canada
Rowers at the 1948 Summer Olympics
Rowers from Hamilton, Ontario